The 3rd Hollywood Critics Association Film Awards, presented by the Hollywood Critics Association, took place on January 9, 2020, virtually. The ceremony was hosted by HCA Founder Scott Menzel. This was the first award show the association had after renaming to HCA after originally going by the Los Angeles Online Film Critics Society.

The nominations were announced on November 25, 2019.

Winners and nominees 
Winners are listed first and highlighted with boldface.

Non-Competition/Honorary awards 

 Breakthrough Performance by an Actor – Kelvin Harrison Jr. for Waves
 Breakthrough Performance by an Actress – Jessie Buckley for Wild Rose
 Inspire Award – Deon Taylor
 Actor of the Decade – Adam Driver
 Actress of the Decade – Kristen Stewart
 Filmmaker of the Decade – Denis Villeneuve
 Producer of the Decade – Daniela Taplin Lundberg
 Game Changer Award – Zack Gottsagen
 Newcomer Award – Paul Walter Hauser
 Star on the Rise Award – Taylor Russell
 Trailblazer Award – Olivia Wilde
 Acting Achievement Award – Anton Yelchin
 Artisan Achievement Award – Ruth E. Carter
 Filmmaking Achievement Award – Bong Joon-ho

Films with multiple wins

Films with multiple nominations

References

Film Awards 03